Ingleburn is a suburb of Sydney, in the state of New South Wales, Australia 40 kilometres south-west of the Sydney central business district, in the local government area of City of Campbelltown. It is part of the Macarthur region. Ingleburn is located approximately halfway between the two commercial centres of Liverpool and Campbelltown.

History 
The land in the Ingleburn area was originally inhabited by the Tharawal people prior to the arrival of settlers from the First Fleet in 1788. The first land grants in the area were made in 1809 to William Neale, Joshua Alliot, all previously soldiers in the NSW Corps. As such, the area became known as "Soldier Flat".

In 1869, a rail platform was built on the old Neale grant and given the name Macquarie Fields Station after a property to the north. However, in 1881 the Macquarie Fields estate subdivided to become the new village of Macquarie Fields. The fact that the station was a long way from the village caused confusion so a new name was sought for the station and Ingleburn was chosen in 1883. One theory has it was named after a local house formerly owned by Mary Ruse, daughter of pioneer James Ruse. Other records indicate it was named after a British town although the corresponding town hasn't been identified. Ingleburn is Scottish for "bend in the river", referring to the significant bend in the nearby Georges River. 

The village of Ingleburn was established in 1885 when the land owned by a developer called Fitz Stubbs was subdivided. A public school was opened in 1887. Ingleburn Post Office opened on 15 November 1886. By 1896, the town was large enough to have its own municipal council. Town improvements such as street lights and water did not arrive until after World War I. In 1948 the Council was merged with the City of Campbelltown Council.

In 1969, a large area west of the railway line was rezoned to become an industrial estate. Protests from local residents saw the plan halted temporarily but within ten years, the west side of the town had become largely industrial and remains so to this day. More housing subdivisions were made on the outskirts of town in the 1970s including Housing Commission developments.

Heritage listings 
Ingleburn has a number of heritage-listed sites, including:
 Campbelltown Road: Ingleburn Military Heritage Precinct and Mont St Quentin Oval
 196 Campbelltown Road: Robin Hood Farm

Commercial areas 
Ingleburn's central business district is adjacent to the railway station and includes two shopping centres called Ingleburn Fair and Ingleburn Town Centre as well as a small shopping area on Lagonda Drive. In 2017 Ingleburn Mall was renovated and many new stores were added and relocated.

Ingleburn is the home of television playout centre MediaHub, a facility established through a joint partnership with WIN Television and ABC Television. Apart from the two networks, it also houses HD-ready playout for Prime7, Imparja Television, and Fox International channels.

Transport

Ingleburn is home to the heritage-listed Ingleburn railway station. The station is serviced by the Airport & South Line on the Sydney Trains network.

Ingleburn is serviced by six Interline bus routes:

 868 Ingleburn Station to Edmondson Park Station
 869 Ingleburn Station to Liverpool Station
 870 Campbelltown Hospital to Liverpool Station
 871 Campbelltown Hospital to Liverpool Station
 872 Campbelltown Hospital to Liverpool Station
 873 Ingleburn Station to Minto Station

For timetables, maps and more information please visit http://interlinebus.com.au

Street names 
Ingleburn has many themes for the naming of streets. Chester Road, Cumberland Road, Cambridge Street, Oxford Road, Suffolk Street, Carlisle Street, Norfolk Street Raglan Avenue, Belford Street, Salford Street and Phoenix Avenue were some of the first streets in the town and are named after English localities.

Birds are another theme with the main thoroughfares Warbler Avenue, Lorikeet Avenue, Currawong Street, Kingfisher Street, Oriole Place, Wagtail Crescent and Kookaburra Street, and smaller streets named after the magpie, jabiru, falcon, lark, ibis, dove, egret, kestrel, swift, heron, miner, jacana, honeyeater, lyrebird, whistler, fantail, swallow, sitella, brolga, swan, owl, quail, and triller.

There is also a car theme with Lancia Drive, Lagonda Drive, Bugatti Drive, Mercedes Road, Maserati Drive and Peugeot Drive becoming main thoroughfares and Fiat, Ferrari, Cadillac, Ford, Alfa, Renault, Rambler, Vauxhall, Buick, Leyland, Delaunay, Daimler, Stutz, Morgan, Sunbeam Place, Pontiac Place, Chevrolet Place, Delage Place and Oldsmobile Place being named after cars too.

Schools
Ingleburn Public School
Ingleburn High School
Sackville Street Public School
Holy Family Primary School

Parks and recreation
Milton Park, shared by the boundaries of Ingleburn and Macquarie Fields is a popular venue for football and softball teams. It is also used as the presentation area for the annual Ingleburn Alive festival's evening fireworks.

Other sporting parks include Wood Park, behind Ingleburn High School where rugby league and cricket are played.

Smaller recreational reserves and parks are located between Kingfisher Road and Currawong Street, on Matthew Square, on Currawong Street behind Holy Family Catholic School and another behind Sackville Street Public School.

Memorial Oval can also be found on the western side of the railway line adjacent to the Ingleburn RSL Club.

Ingleburn RSL is located on Chester Road. Annually at dawn on ANZAC Day, a service is held to remember those that lost their lives serving for Australia.

Population
At the 2021 Australian census, there were 15,264 residents in Ingleburn. 52.5% of people were born in Australia. The next most common countries of birth were Bangladesh 5.4%, India 5.3% Philippines 4.2%, Nepal 4.1% and New Zealand 2.6%. 52.1% of people spoke only English at home. Other languages spoken at home included Bengali 7.2%, Hindi 4.8%, Tagalog 2.5% and Arabic 2.0%. The most common responses for religion were Catholic 22.1%, No Religion 19.5%, Islam 11.7%, Anglican 10.2% and Hinduism 9.7%.

References

External links

 Ingleburn Library
 Ingleburn Chamber of Commerce & Industry
 Holy Family Parish School

 
Suburbs of Sydney
Hume Highway